Eulenspiegel – Das Satiremagazin is a German humor and satirical magazine. It is published by Eulenspiegel GmbH in Berlin. It is one of three East German magazines survived after the German unification. The other two are das Magazin and Guter Rat.

History
Eulenspiegel is a successor of the satirical publication Frischer Wind, which began publishing in 1946. The publication took the title Eulenspiegel in 1954, after the similarly titled but unconnected satirical magazine Ulenspiegel ceased publishing in 1950. 

Until 1972, Eulenspiegel was published by Eulenspiegel Verlag, also founded in 1954, which later became an independent book publisher. It was the only satirical magazine in the German Democratic Republic.

References

External links

 
 
Article on the magazine's 50th anniversary Süddeutsche Zeitung 

1954 establishments in East Germany
Mass media in East Germany
German-language magazines
Magazines established in 1954
Magazines published in Berlin
Monthly magazines published in Germany
Satirical magazines published in Germany